Waldenbuch Castle is a castle in the German state of Baden-Württemberg.

It was a hunting lodge used by the dukes of Württemberg, and was first mentioned in 1381. The core of the structure was an old castle.

See also
List of castles in Baden-Württemberg

Hunting lodges in Germany